Vitaly Viktorovich Minakov (born February 6, 1985, Bryansk) is a Russian mixed martial artist, sambist and judoka currently competing in the heavyweight division of Bellator MMA, where he is the former Bellator MMA Heavyweight World Champion. A professional competitor since 2010, he has also competed for M-1 Global and Fight Nights Global.

2012 Olympics
Because Vitaly is a numerous Sambo World Champion and a Junior Russian National Champion in Judo, he considered competing at the 2012 Olympics in London. It is unknown why he didn't make the team.

Mixed martial arts career

MMA career
Minakov made his professional MMA debut in November 2010. He is a Sambo World Champion, (2008–2011).

Minakov defeated UFC and Bellator veteran Eddie Sanchez on June 7, 2012 at Fight Nights - Battle of Moscow 7. He won via KO in the first round.

Minakov defeated Brazilian Jiu-Jitsu World Champion and UFC veteran Fabiano Scherner on September 17, 2012 at Fight Nights - Battle of Desne. He won via KO in the first round.

Bellator MMA
In June 2012, Minakov was signed in Bellator.

He made his debut the following fall at Bellator 79 on November 2, 2012. He defeated a Moldavian National Champion & Judo Black Belt  Vladimir Starcencov via TKO in the second round to win his Bellator and North American debut.

Minakov faced Ron Sparks on June 19, 2013 in the Bellator Heavyweight Tournament Semifinal. He won in the first round by technical knockout.

Minakov faced Ryan Martinez at Bellator 97 in the finals on July 31, 2013. He got the TKO victory via punches in the third round, after he took Martinez down and secured full mount.

Minakov faced and defeated Alexander Volkov on November 15, 2013 at Bellator 108 to win the Bellator Heavyweight Championship.

Minakov faced Bellator Season 9 Heavyweight Tournament winner Cheick Kongo at Bellator 115 on April 4, 2014. He won via unanimous decision to retain the Bellator Heavyweight Championship.

Minakov was stripped of his Bellator MMA title on May 14, 2016 due to inactivity.

Post-Bellator
After leaving Bellator MMA, Minakov returned to fight in his native Russia, under Fight Nights Global promotion. He fought seven times since July 2015 and won all seven of his bouts by finishes.

Return to Bellator
On August 23, 2018 it was revealed that Minakov and his management team had reconciled with Bellator and reached an agreement for a new contract. The new contract was for 6 bouts at $300,000 per fight, with his win bonuses applied on top of that fee.

On January 16, 2019, RusFighters LLC, Minakov's agent and manager, filed a lawsuit in the Orange County Superior Court against Minakov and Ali Abdelaziz, claiming Minakov breached the agreement with RusFighters when he used Abdelaziz to sign the new contract with Bellator. On February 28, 2020, the courts agreed that RusFighters LLC is owed 20% of any gross performance compensation of any bout during the term of his 6 bout Bellator contract.

In his return, Minakov faced Cheick Kongo in a rematch at Bellator 216 on February 16, 2019. He lost the fight via unanimous decision, marking his first professional loss in MMA.

Minakov was to face Javy Ayala at Bellator 225 on August 24, 2019. However, on the day of the fight, it was announced that Ayala was pulled from the bout due to undisclosed medical reasons. Minakov instead faced Tim Johnson. Minakov won the bout via first round knockout.

Minakov was re-scheduled to meet Ayala at Bellator 232 on October 26, 2019. However, Minakov was unable to obtain visa for the bout, leading to Ayala being pulled from the card also.

Minakov was scheduled to face Tyrell Fortune on October 23, 2021 at Bellator 269. However in August, it was announced that Fortune pulled out due to unknown reasons and was replaced by Said Sowma. He lost the bout after it was stopped due to a broken finger.

Championships and accomplishments

Martial arts
 Bellator MMA
 Bellator Heavyweight World Championship (One time)
 One Successful Title Defense.
 Bellator 2013 Summer Series Heavyweight Tournament Championship.
 Tied (with Tyrell Fortune) for most knockout victories in Bellator Heavyweight division (five)

 Fight Nights Global
 Undefeated in Fight Nights (9-0)

 Global-MMA
 Global-MMA Fighter of the Year 2013.

Sambo
 Fédération Internationale de Sambo (FIAS)
 Sambo World Champion (4 time)
 Russian National Champion (4 time)
 Russian Presidential Cup Sambo Champion (3 time - 2008, 2009, 2010)

Judo
 Russian Judo Federation
2006 Russian U23 Championships: 1st place
2005 Russian U23 Championships: 3rd place
2004 Russian U20 Championships: 2nd place

Mixed martial arts record

|-
| Loss
| align=center|22–2
|Said Sowma
|TKO (finger injury)
|Bellator 269
|
|align=center|3
|align=center|3:08
|Moscow, Russia
|
|-
|Win
|align=center|22–1
|Timothy Johnson
|KO (punches) 
|Bellator 225
|
|align=center|1
|align=center|1:45
|Bridgeport, Connecticut, United States
|
|-
| Loss
| align=center|21–1
| Cheick Kongo
| Decision (unanimous)
| Bellator 216
| 
| align=center|3
| align=center|5:00
| Uncasville, Connecticut, United States
| 
|-
| Win
| align=center| 21–0
| Tony Johnson
| TKO (punches)
| Fight Nights Global 82: Minakov vs. Johnson
| 
| align=center|2
| align=center|0:38
| Moscow, Moscow Oblast, Russia
| 
|-
| Win
| align=center| 20–0
| Antônio Silva
| KO (punches)
| Fight Nights Global 68: Pavlovich vs. Mokhnatkin
| 
| align=center|2
| align=center|1:37
| St. Petersburg, Leningrad oblast, Russia
| 
|-
|Win
| align=center| 19–0
| DJ Linderman
| KO (punches)
| Fight Nights Global 59: Minakov vs. Linderman
|
|align=center| 3
|align=center| 3:09
| Khimki, Moscow Oblast, Russia
|
|-
| Win
| align=center| 18–0
| Peter Graham
| Submission (armbar)
| Fight Nights Global 50: Fedor vs. Maldonado
| 
| align=center| 1
| align=center|1:01
| St. Petersburg, Leningrad oblast, Russia
| 
|-
| Win
| align=center| 17–0
| Josh Copeland
| Submission (kimura)
| Fight Nights: Battle of Moscow 20	
| 
| align=center| 2
| align=center| 2:50
| Moscow, Moscow oblast, Russia
| 
|-
| Win
| align=center| 16–0
| Geronimo dos Santos
| Submission (armbar)
| Fight Nights Global: Dagestan
| 
| align=center| 1
| align=center| 3:14
| Kaspiysk, Dagestan, Russia
| 
|-
| Win
| align=center| 15–0
| Adam Maciejewski
| TKO (punches)
| Fight Nights Global: Sochi
| 
| align=center| 1
| align=center| 0:20
| Sochi, Krasnodar krai, Russia
| 
|-
| Win
| align=center| 14–0
| Cheick Kongo
| Decision (unanimous)
| Bellator 115
| 
| align=center| 5
| align=center| 5:00
| Reno, Nevada, United States
| 
|-
| Win
| align=center| 13–0
| Alexander Volkov
| TKO (punches)
| Bellator 108
| 
| align=center| 1
| align=center| 2:57
| Atlantic City, New Jersey, United States
| 
|-
| Win
| align=center| 12–0
| Ryan Martinez
| TKO (punches)
| Bellator 97
| 
| align=center| 3
| align=center| 4:02
| Rio Rancho, New Mexico, United States
| 
|-
| Win
| align=center| 11–0
| Ron Sparks
| KO (punches)
| Bellator 96
| 
| align=center| 1
| align=center| 0:32
| Thackerville, Oklahoma, United States
|
|-
| Win
| align=center| 10–0
| Vladimir Starcencov
| TKO (punches)
| Bellator 79
| 
| align=center| 2
| align=center| 0:27
| Rama, Ontario, Canada
|
|-
| Win
| align=center| 9–0
| Fabiano Scherner
| TKO (punches)
| Fight Nights: Battle of Desne
| 
| align=center| 1
| align=center| 3:51
| Bryansk, Bryansk Oblast, Russia
| 
|-
| Win
| align=center| 8–0
| Eddie Sanchez
| KO (punch)
| Fight Nights: Battle of Moscow 7
| 
| align=center| 1
| align=center| 1:59
| Moscow, Moscow Oblast, Russia
| 
|-
| Win
| align=center| 7–0
| Karol Celinski
| TKO (corner stoppage)
| Faxe Forward Challenge 2: Russia vs. Latvia
| 
| align=center| 1
| align=center| 0:55
| Riga, Vidzeme, Latvia
| 
|-
| Win
| align=center| 6–0
| Ivan Frolov
| Submission (guillotine choke)
| AntMMA: Ultimate Fighting of Bryansk
| 
| align=center| 1
| align=center| 0:45
| Bryansk, Bryansk Oblast, Russia
| 
|-
| Win
| align=center| 5–0
| Juan Espino
| TKO (punches)
| League S-70: Sambo 70 vs. Spain
| 
| align=center| 1
| align=center| 0:09
| Moscow, Russia
| 
|-
| Win
| align=center| 4–0
| Valery Scherbakov
| Submission (armbar)
| M-1 Challenge 22: Narkun vs. Vasilevsky
| 
| align=center| 1
| align=center| 1:05
| Moscow, Moscow Oblast, Russia
| 
|-
| Win
| align=center| 3–0
| Vitalii Yalovenko
| Decision (unanimous)
| M-1 Selection 2010: Eastern Europe Finals
| 
| align=center| 3
| align=center| 5:00
| Moscow, Moscow Oblast, Russia
| 
|-
| Win
| align=center| 2–0
| Alexander Zubachov
| Submission (rear-naked choke)
| Sambo-70/M-1 Global: Sochi Open European Championships
| 
| align=center| 1
| align=center| 0:27
| Sochi, Krasnodar Krai, Russia
| 
|-
| Win
| align=center| 1–0
| Ruslan Kabdulin
| Submission (armbar)
| M-1 Selection 2010: Eastern Europe Round 2
| 
| align=center| 1
| align=center| 4:19
| Kyiv, Kyiv Oblast, Ukraine
|

See also
 List of Bellator MMA alumni
 List of male mixed martial artists

References

External links
 

Living people
1985 births
Heavyweight mixed martial artists
Russian sambo practitioners
Russian male sport wrestlers
Russian male judoka
Sportspeople from Bryansk
Russian expatriates in the United States
Russian male mixed martial artists
Bellator MMA champions
Bellator male fighters
Mixed martial artists utilizing sambo
Mixed martial artists utilizing freestyle wrestling
Mixed martial artists utilizing judo